John Henry Johnson (born August 21, 1956) is a former Major League Baseball player. He was drafted by the San Francisco Giants in the 15th round of the 1974 amateur draft. He made his major league debut after being traded along with Gary Thomasson, Gary Alexander, Dave Heaverlo, Phil Huffman, Alan Wirth and $300,000 from the Giants to the Oakland Athletics for Vida Blue on March 15, . Mario Guerrero was sent to the Athletics on April 7 to complete the transaction.

From 1979 thru 1981, Johnson played for the Texas Rangers.  He ended his career with the Milwaukee Brewers.

References

External links

1956 births
Living people
Major League Baseball pitchers
Baseball players from Houston
Oakland Athletics players
Texas Rangers players
Boston Red Sox players
Milwaukee Brewers players